This is a list of gridiron football teams in Canada.

Professional teams

Active leagues

Canadian football

Canadian Football League

Active teams

Defunct teams

Indoor football/arena football

Arena Football League

Defunct team

Can- Am Indoor Football League

Defunct Teams

Defunct leagues

American football

American Football Conference

Continental Football League

United Football League

World Football League

World League of American Football

Semi-professional/senior

American Football

Empire Football League

Active teams

Defunct teams

Mid Continental Football League

Defunct teams

North American Football League

Active teams

Defunct teams

Canadian Football

Canadian Major Football League

Active teams

Alberta Football League

Northern Football Conference

Defunct teams

Maritime Football League

Active teams

Defunct teams

University

American football

National Association of Intercollegiate Athletics

Defunct teams

National Collegiate Athletic Association

Active team

Great Northwest Athletic Conference

Canadian football

U Sports

Active teams

Atlantic University Sport

Canada West Universities Athletic Association

Ontario University Athletics

Réseau du sport étudiant du Québec

Defunct teams

Junior football

Canadian football

Canadian Junior Football League

Active teams

British Columbia Football Conference

Ontario Football Conference

Prairie Football Conference

Defunct teams

Quebec Junior Football League

Active teams

Defunct teams

Atlantic Football League

Active teams

Defunct teams

Varsity football

Canadian football

Ontario Football Conference

Active teams

Defunct teams

Ontario Varsity Football League

Women's football

Canadian football

Central Canadian Women's Football League

Maritime Women's Football League

Western Women's Canadian Football League

Western Conference

Prairie Conference

Indoor football/arena football

Lingerie Football League Canada

Defunct teams

See also
North American Indoor Football League (2005)
Professional football in Canada

Notes

 
 
Football